Jesse J. Prinz is a Distinguished Professor of philosophy and Director of the Committee for Interdisciplinary Science Studies at the Graduate Center of the City University of New York.

Prinz works primarily in the philosophy of psychology and ethics and has authored several books and over 100 articles, addressing such topics as emotion, moral psychology, aesthetics and consciousness.  Much of his work in these areas has been a defense of empiricism against psychological nativism, and he situates his work as in the naturalistic tradition of philosophy associated with David Hume.  Prinz is also an advocate of experimental philosophy.

Education and career

Prinz took his Ph.D. at the University of Chicago under the direction of Murat Aydede, a philosopher of cognitive science.  He taught previously at the University of North Carolina at Chapel Hill and at Washington University in St. Louis, with visiting positions at University College London, California Institute of Technology, and University of Maryland, College Park.

Philosophical work

Philosophy of emotions
Jesse Prinz has offered a "natural kinds" theory of emotions.  According to him, an emotional experience is a bodily change that indicates situations in our environment that should concern us.  When we encounter a stimulus that affects our well-being we experience a set of bodily changes that represent things like dangers, losses, and offenses.  These bodily changes are appropriate to the situation and are learned over time through association to specific instances we have encountered in the past.  They are felt, but oftentimes these feelings are not in the foreground of phenomenal consciousness.  When we do pay attention to the feeling it then becomes an actual emotion.

The set of possible feelings are limited by our biology and correspond roughly to our traditional emotional categories.  The traditional emotions (anger, fear, etc.) have functional roles and are always related to objects and situations in the environment.  They are always directed toward something (i.e. intentional), and these emotions have a particular bodily configuration that defines them.  According to Prinz, there are six basic emotions, which are characterized by unique body patterns. The ‘big six’ emotions are actually subdivided into a biologically basic primitive stock of feelings that each culture classifies in different ways.  For example, fear could be subdivided into worry (future dangers) and panic (present dangers), both of which spring the experiencing organism into action as an appropriate response to environmental stimulus.  Likewise, happiness subdivides into sensory pleasure, satisfaction, and joy which each have specific bodily responses.  Complex emotions such as despair, romantic love, and jealousy are recent (on an evolutionary timescale) additions to the breadth of possible affects that are also associations between our primitive stock of feelings and particular kinds of situations.  Other homeostatic emotions such as hunger and fatigue are different in that they are states of the organism rather than relationships between it and its environment.

According to this theory, when we encounter certain stimuli we experience a learned bodily change in response.  These bodily-change stimuli, or elicitors, belong to what Prinz calls a mental file that is connected to one of our primitive stock of emotions through learning.  These “elicitation files” can then trigger the relevant response previously associated with it.  Throughout our lives new files can be created and new triggering conditions can be added to existing files.  Similar files can become so closely related that triggers for one can also cause the other.   However, these elicitation files should not be confused with the emotions themselves, but rather they are culturally calibrated triggers for our emotions.  According to Prinz, affects are exhausted by the somatic feelings that are experienced.  Emotions are only the feelings and not the causes or effects of those feelings.  Each feeling is associated with a range of conditions and represents a response to the current situation being experienced.

Ethics and moral psychology

Prinz also defends sentimentalism in ethics, and ethical relativism.

Books
Furnishing the Mind: Concepts and Their Perceptual Basis (MIT: 2002)
Gut Reactions: A Perceptual Theory of Emotion (OUP: 2004)
The Emotional Construction of Morals (OUP: 2007)
Beyond Human Nature (Penguin/Norton: 2012)
The Conscious Brain (OUP: 2012)

Edited books
The Handbook of Philosophy of Psychology. Oxford: Oxford University Press (forthcoming).
Mind and Cognition, 3rd Edition (with William Lycan).  Oxford: Blackwell (Blackwell: 2008)
Section on 'Philosophy of Mind'. St. Cahn (ed.) Philosophy for the 21st Century. (OUP: 2002).

References

External links
Prinz Personal Homepage
Prinz archive on the CUNY Philosophy Commons
Discussion of experimental philosophy on YouTube
Video interview/discussion with Prinz and Will Wilkinson on Bloggingheads.tv
The Moscow Center for Consciousness Studies video interview with Jesse Prinz
Date palm compote interview with Prinz (Russian and English)

University of North Carolina at Chapel Hill faculty
Graduate Center, CUNY faculty
Living people
21st-century American philosophers
Philosophers of psychology
Moral psychologists
Philosophers of mind
Year of birth missing (living people)
Washington University in St. Louis faculty
Academic staff of the University of British Columbia